Aiken County can refer to

 Aiken County, South Carolina
 Aiken County, Minnesota: former name of Aitkin County, Minnesota